Stranac u noći (lit. "Stranger in the night") may refer to:

 Stranac u noći (Idoli song), 1983 song by the Serbian rock band Idoli
 Stranac u noći (album), 1987 album by the Croatian singer Massimo Savić

See also
 Stranci u noći (plural form), 1966 song by Ivo Robić